Dischidodactylus duidensis (common name: Mount Duida frog) is a species of frog in the family Craugastoridae. It is endemic to Venezuela and only known from its type locality, Cerro Duida. It was formally described in 1968 by Juan A. Rivero, even though the type series was collected 40 years earlier by George Henry Hamilton Tate.

Description
The type series consists of four specimens: the holotype, a female  in snout–vent length (SVL), and paratypes, a male and a female both  SVL, and a juvenile  SVL. Skin is roughly granular and very dark, almost black above, and greyish brown below. Snout is rounded. Tympanum is small and indistinct. Fingers are free but toes are about one-third webbed.

Habitat and conservation
Dischidodactylus duidensis were collected by G. H. H. Tate from near waterfalls and streams on Cerro Duida at elevations of  asl, but specific detail on its habitat were not available.

There are no known threats to this species. It occurs in the Duida–Marahuaca National Park.

References

duidensis
Amphibians of Venezuela
Endemic fauna of Venezuela
Amphibians described in 1968
Taxa named by Juan A. Rivero
Taxonomy articles created by Polbot